The Church of St. James the Apostle, or as it is known today as St. James Episcopal Church or Iglesia Episcopal de Santiago is an Episcopal church in Oakland, California, United States. The church has been providing weekly services without break since 1858. It is a California Historical Landmark.

History

The church was founded by Bishop William Ingraham Kip. Its first day of service was June 27, 1858. The first church, completed circa 1860, is now used as a parish house. The current church was built in 1886 to a design by San Francisco architects Wright & Sanders.

References

External links
Official website

California Historical Landmarks
Episcopal church buildings in California
Churches in Oakland, California
1858 establishments in California